Polaki may refer to:
Polaki, Iran, a village in Sistan and Baluchestan Province
Polaki, Kočani, a village in North Macedonia
Polaki, Poland, a village in Poland
Polaki, Srikakulam, a village in India